Vardablur is a village in the Lori Province of Armenia. It was in this village that Komitas composed "Horoveluh" and Hovhannes Tumanyan wrote "Hazaranblbuluh".

References 

World Gazeteer: Armenia – World-Gazetteer.com

Populated places in Lori Province